Sabrina is a Bangladeshi drama thriller streaming television series created by Ashfaque Nipun. The cast includes Mehazabien Chowdhury, Nazia Haque Orsha, and Runa Khan. It premiered on Hoichoi on 25 March 2022.

Premise

Cast
 Mehazabien Chowdhury as Dr. Sabrina
 Nazia Haque Orsha as Sabrina Hussain
 Runa Khan as Baby
 Intekhab Dinar as Showkat Hossain
 Hasan Masood as Bahadur
 Yash Rohan as Abhi
 Ejajul Islam as Khurshed Alam
 Faruque Ahamed as Liyakat Hossain

Episodes

Release
On 8 March 2022, Hoichoi unveiled the teaser of the series at A S Mahmud Hall, The Daily Star.

References

External links
 

Bangladeshi web series
Drama web series
Bengali-language web series
2022 web series debuts
2022 Bangladeshi television series debuts
Streaming television in Bangladesh
Television series created by Ashfaque Nipun
Bengali-language nonlinear narrative television series
2020s Bangladeshi drama television series
Hoichoi original programming